Tashan-e Gharbi Rural District is a rural district (dehestan) in Tashan District, Behbahan County, Khuzestan Province, Iran. At the 2006 census, its population was 4,173, in 863 families.  The rural district has 20 villages.

References 

Rural Districts of Khuzestan Province
Behbahan County